The molecular formula C9H13N3O5 (molar mass: 243.22 g/mol, exact mass: 243.0855 u) may refer to:

 Cytarabine, or cytosine arabinoside (ara-C)
 Cytidine

Molecular formulas